Socrates Krishnan Valath, (born 1963) is an Indian novelist and short story writer, working in Malayalam literature. His short story anthology, Nyayavithi, was selected for the Padmarajan Award in 2014. He is also a recipient of the Kerala State Television Award in 2003, C. Ayyappan Award in 2015 and a Certificate of Merit at the Annual Akashvani Awards in 2017.

Biography 
Socrates Valath was born in 1963 to the writer V. V. K. Valath as the youngest of three sons, in Ernakulam . His entry into Malayalam literature was with a short story, Vala, published in Mathrubhumi weekly in 1987. It preceded a number of books which include his novel, Aanandalahari, and six short story anthologies. He has also published a book of interviews, Kathaantharangal, which features a number of interviews he had with his fellow writers including S. Hareesh, Thomas Joseph, Unni R., Santhosh Echikkanam and E. Santhosh Kumar and V. J. James.

Valalth's entry into films was in 2003, when he directed Harappa to Pokhran, a children's film which was aired in Surya TV. Subsequently, he wrote the screenplay and dialogues for two films, Thavalam in 2008 and KQ in 2013. He has also directed a documentary, And the Fight Goes On, on the quadriplegic writer and historian, MP Anil Kumar. Besides, he has compiled stories for Crime File for Surya TV and Jeevan TV, created content for the programmes, Vipani for Doordarshan, Business Watch for Asianet, and Haritha Keralam for Jeevan TV and scripted the tele-serials, Adaminte Santhathikal for Asianet and Ente Kuttikalude Achan for Mazhavil Manorama.

Valath lives in North Paravur, in Ernakulam district.

Awards and honours 
Harappa to Pokhran, a Saljith P. R. production directed by Valath, was selected for the award for the best children's programme at the 2003 Kerala State Television Awards. A decade later, his short story anthology, Nyaayavithi, fetched him the Padmarajan Award in 2014. He received the C. Ayyappan Award for short story in 2015 and Janala (The Window), a radioplay he wrote for the Thrissur station of the All India Radio, was selected for the Certificate of Merit at the Akashvani annual competition in 2017.

Selected bibliography

Short story anthology

Novel 
  third edition 2022

Interviews

See also 

 List of Malayalam-language authors by category
 List of Malayalam-language authors

Notes

References

Further reading

External links 
 
 
 

Writers from Kerala
Malayalam-language writers
Malayali people
People from Ernakulam district
21st-century Indian novelists
21st-century Indian short story writers
21st-century Indian journalists
21st-century Indian film directors
Screenwriters from Kerala
20th-century Indian short story writers
20th-century Indian novelists
20th-century Indian journalists
1963 births
Living people